The 17th Youth in Film Awards ceremony (now known as the Young Artist Awards), presented by the Youth in Film Association, honored outstanding youth performers under the age of 21 in the fields of film, television and music for the 1994–1995 season, and took place in 1996 in Hollywood, California.

Established organization to establish an awards ceremony specifically set to recognize and award the contributions of performers under the age of 21 in the fields of film, television, theater and music.

Categories
★ Bold indicates the winner in each category.

Best Young Performer in a Feature Film

Best Young Leading Actor: Feature Film
★ Wil Horneff – Born to Be Wild
Jerry Barone – Two Bits
Jesse Bradford – Far From Home: The Adventures of Yellow Dog
Brad Renfro & Joseph Mazzello – The Cure
Hal Scardino – The Indian in the Cupboard
Ryan Slater – The Amazing Panda Adventure
Jonathan Taylor Thomas – Tom and Huck

Best Young Leading Actress: Feature Film
★ Anna Chlumsky – Gold Diggers: The Secret of Bear Mountain
Vanessa Lee Chester – A Little Princess
Liesel Matthews – A Little Princess
Christina Ricci – Casper
Claire Danes – Home for the Holidays
Kirsten Dunst – Jumanji
Nicole Lund – Gold Diggers: The Secret of Bear Mountain
Alicia Silverstone – Clueless

Best Young Supporting Actor: Feature Film
★ Jonathan Hernandez – My Family
Joseph Anderson – Mr. Holland's Opus
Steve Cardenas – Mighty Morphin Power Rangers: The Movie
Rishi Bhat – The Indian in the Cupboard
Thomas Ian Nicholas – A Kid in King Arthur's Court

Best Young Supporting Actress: Feature Film
★ Kristy Young – Gordy
Stacey Dash – Clueless
Julia Devin – The Tie That Binds
Brittany Murphy – Clueless
Jean Marie Barnwell – Born to Be Wild
Sarah Wayne – Magic in the Water
Yi Ding – The Amazing Panda Adventure

Best Performance by a Young Actor Under 10: Feature Film
★ Nicholas John Renner – Mr. Holland's Opus
Jimmy Baker – Man of the House
Dylan Haggerty – Grizzly Mountain
Joshua Haines – Three Wishes
Joel Palmer – Far From Home: The Adventures of Yellow Dog
Andy Ryan – Paul McCall

Best Performance by a Young Actress Under 10: Feature Film
★ Scarlett Pomers – The Baby-Sitters Club
Courtney Chase – Roommates
Bethany Richards – Angus
Ashley Olsen – It Takes Two
Mary-Kate Olsen – It Takes Two

Best Young Performer in a TV Special

Best Performance by a Young Actor: TV Special
★ Mike McCarthy – Deadly Whispers
Robert Bishop – Breach of Faith
Geoffrey Scott Brown – Fast Forward
Toran Caudell – Max Is Missing
Noah Fleiss – A Mother's Prayer
Victor Rajas – Max is Missing
Shane Sweet – Indictment: The McMartin Trial

Best Performance by a Young Actress: TV Special
★ Sandee Van Dyke – The Judds
Kyndra Joy Casper – The Great Mom Swap
Robin Lynn Heath – The Stranger
Ashley Johnson – Annie: A Royal Adventure!
Laura Morgan – Love Can Build a Bridge

Best Young Performer in a TV Series

Best Performance by a Young Actor: TV Drama Series
★ Shawn Toovey – Dr. Quinn, Medicine Woman
Steven Hartman – The Bold and the Beautiful
Jonathan Jackson – General Hospital
Cirroc Lofton – Star Trek: Deep Space Nine
Chaz Ryan – Days of Our Lives
Kyle Sabihy – The Bold and the Beautiful
Micheal Sullivan – Days of Our Lives
Billy Tolson – Walker, Texas Ranger

Best Performance by a Young Actress: TV Drama Series
★ Jessica Bowman – Dr. Quinn, Medicine Woman
Lacey Chabert – Party of Five
Yvonne Zima – ER
Erin Torpey – One Life to Live
Heather Tom – The Young and the Restless
Maitland Ward – The Young and the Restless
Courtney Peldon – Renegade

Best Performance by a Young Actor: TV Comedy Series
★ Benjamin Salisbury – The Nanny
Christopher Castile – Step by Step
Zane Carney – Dave's World
Will Estes – Kirk
Frankie J. Galasso – Hudson Street
Sam Gifaldi – Bless This House
Richard Lee Jackson – Saved by the Bell: The New Class
Matthew Lawrence – Brotherly Love
Nick Scoullar – The Anti-Gravity Room
Phillip Van Dyke – The Home Court
Jake Richardson – Fudge
Bobby E. McAdams II – Minor Adjustments

Best Performance by a Young Actress: TV Comedy Series
★ Nassira Nicola – Fudge
Danielle Fishel – Boy Meets World
Meghann Haldeman – The Home Court
Ashley Johnson – Maybe This Time
Sarah Lancaster – Saved by the Bell: The New Class
Tia & Tamera Mowry – Sister, Sister
Nicholle Tom – The Nanny
Madeline Zima – The Nanny
Lisa Rieffel – Women of the House
Maia Campbell – In the House
Natanya Ross – The Secret World of Alex Mack

Best Performance by a Young Actor: Guest Starring Role TV Series
★ Justin Thomson – Boy Meets World
Anthony Jesse Cruz – Baywatch
John Graas – Dr. Quinn, Medicine Woman
Richard Lee Jackson – Star Trek: Deep Space Nine
Lucky Luciano – The Tonight Show
Chris J. Miller – Maybe This Time

Best Performance by a Young Actress: Guest Starring Role TV Series
★ Kim Cullum – Home Improvement
Kyndra Joy Casper – NYPD Blue
Erin J. Dean – Boy Meets World
Yunoka Doyle – Touched by an Angel
Lisa Rieffel – Brotherly Love
Krista Sherre Selico – Sister, Sister
Sabrina Wiener – Charlie Grace
Lisa Wilhoit – Walker, Texas Ranger

Best Performance by a Young Actor Under 10: Television
★ Ross Bagley – The Fresh Prince of Bel-Air
Spencer Treat Clark – Another World
Andrew Ducote – Dave's World
Andy Lawrence – Brotherly Love
Jacob Loyst – Sisters
Courtland Mead – Kirk
Haley Joel Osment – The Jeff Foxworthy Show
Jeffery Wood – In the House

Best Performance by a Young Actress Under 10: Television
★ Kaitlin Cullum – Grace Under Fire
Brittany Holmes – Ellen
Kylie Erica Mar – The Parent 'Hood
Camille Winbush – Minor Adjustments
Danielle Wiener – Diagnosis: Murder

Best Young Performer in a Voiceover Role

Best Performance by a Young Actor: Voiceover Role
★ Malachi Pearson – Casper
Josh Keaton – Todd Lincoln
Chris Allport – The Donna Reed Show
Roland Thomson – The Revolutionary War

Best Performance by a Young Actress: Voiceover Role
★ Sarah Freeman – Toy Story
Rachel Miner – Orphan Train
Danielle Wiener – This Is America, Charlie Brown
Sabrina Wiener – Santo Bugito

Best Young Ensemble Performance

Best Performances by a Young Ensemble: Feature Film or Video
★ The Baby-Sitters Club – Columbia Pictures/TriStar PicturesNow and Then – New Line Cinema
Secret Adventures: Slam and Split – Taweel-Loos and Company
The Brady Bunch Movie – Paramount Pictures

Best Performance by a Young Ensemble: Television
★ The Secret World of Alex Mack – NickelodeonThe Home Court – NBC
Sweet Valley High – Saban
Fudge – ABC
Are You Afraid of the Dark? – Nickelodeon

Best Young Entertainer: Acting and Singing

Best Professional Actress/Singer
★ Moriah SnyderBrittany Murphy
Ivyann Schwan
Jennifer Love Hewitt

Best Professional Actor/Singer
★ Chris AllportFrankie J. Galasso
Josh Keaton
Zachary McLemore

Best Family Entertainment

Best Family Animation Production
★ Animaniacs – Warner BrothersThe Adventures of Dudley the Dragon – Canadian TV
Doug – Nickelodeon
Siegfried and Roy – DIC
This Is America, Charlie Brown – Lee Mendelson

Best Family Feature: Action-Adventure
★ Jumanji – TriStarThe Amazing Panda Adventure – Warner Brothers
Far from Home: The Adventures of Yellow Dog – 20th Century Fox
Magic in the Water – Columbia-TriStar
Gold Diggers: The Secret of Bear Mountain – Universal
Grizzly Mountain – Hemdale

Best Family Feature: Musical or Comedy
★ Toy Story – Walt DisneyBabe – Universal
Balto – Universal
Casper – Universal
Clueless – Paramount
Pocahontas – Walt Disney

Best Family Feature: Drama
★ Mr. Holland's Opus – Walt DisneyApollo 13 – Universal
The Cure – Universal
The Indian in the Cupboard – Paramount
A Little Princess – Warner Brothers
Two Bits – Miramax

Youth In Film's Special Awards

The Jackie Coogan Award

Outstanding Contribution to Youth Through Motion Pictures
★ Christopher Reeve – For his Inspiration to YouthThe Michael Landon Award

Outstanding Contribution to Youth Through Television
★ Dr. Quinn, Medicine Woman – For Outstanding Family Television Series of the YearBeth Sullivan – Executive Producer; Timothy Johnson – Producer; Chad Allen, Jessica Bowman, Shawn Toovey – Young Stars of the SeriesOutstanding Contribution To Youth Through Entertainment
★ World Youth News – Kris Kollins and Mick Kollins

The power of video for kids is a message Mick and Kris Kollins want to get out to youth everywhere as well. After this father-and-son team saw studies showing that kids didn't like what they saw on the news—they felt all the stories were depressing and downbeat—they decided to create "World Youth News," a news program about kids, by kids from around the world.

Calling All Shooters
The first step in a process that has already put six episodes of "World Youth News" on the air was to contact schools around the world and ask them to put up "Help Wanted" flyers on job bulletin boards. The resulting response has been incredible. And it's easy to see why: "World Youth News" pays 250 dollars for each story they use. According to Mick, that's no small potatoes in some countries.

"In Eastern Europe, for instance, an adult male takes home the equivalent of about 150 US dollars a month. And that's considered a good salary. Now you get his kid who comes up with a story, videotapes it and sends it to us and we use it, that kid's got 250 US dollars. Let me tell you, that kid is suddenly a real hero."

"It gives them a real sense of purpose and legitimacy," says Kris. "We make ID cards for them—press badges. Some of our kids have used those press badges to get into political rallies and things like that."

Gaining Exposure
As of right now, "World Youth News" is on two different cable networks three times a week. Combined totals from both networks means WYN (pronounced "win") is currently in about 22 million homes. And that's just in the United States. European interest has been gaining steadily—20 countries are currently in negotiation. One, Saudi Arabia, has already placed an order for 26 episodes.

Success, however, has not been easy. "When we first finished the pilot, we took it to a lot of people and they simply didn't know what to do with it. It wasn't like anything they had seen before. It wasn't exactly a news show and it wasn't exactly some kind of entertainment. It was infotainment."

Still, Mick and Kris knew they were on to something. Says Mick: "The teen market is the largest market in the world, end of story. Last year, American teens, which number about 30 million, spent 57 billion dollars of their own money."

Says Kris: "Besides that, they are the most accessible group—the easiest to talk to. We've got it so they're the ones who are doing the shooting and they're the ones who are digesting that same information. We don't see a lot of good things for teens and we really wanted this to be one of the good things."

Making Plans
But "World Youth News" is only part of their plan. As they expand, their intention is to create the World Youth Network.

"Right now," Mick says, "we have a mini-CNN in place. We've got shooters all over the world who are sending us stories and whom we can contact to go and get a story for us. Our ultimate goal, however, is to expand into the on-line arena and become a complete on-line service. That way, people can send their videos to us straight into our computers and the users out there can have direct access to that same information. We want to provide a service where the user can become a participant."

"Besides," says Kris, "we've got a lot of footage that people have sent to us that we haven't been able to use yet, and we're in the process of archiving it. When we're finished, we'll have this incredible library of footage that, with the right software, people from anywhere in the world will be able to look at, just as if they're going to the library."

Direct work with the kids who shoot for them has already been happening. In one case, they received three different tapes from London, England, all on similar stories. The problem was that each tape wasn't really complete. "One had good camera work," Mick explains, "but lousy writing. Another had good writing, but lousy camera work." So Mick and Kris put all three into contact with each other and sent them out as a team to get the story on unemployment that appears in the first episode of "World Youth News."

"It's very interesting to see how kids from different countries have different skills and different approaches. But that still doesn't make me think they're really that different. I think if you went into any kid's room in any country in the world, you wouldn't be able to tell what country you were in. They're all wearing Reeboks and Levi's. I think kids are essentially the same the world over and that's why this concept is so powerful."

Interested in participating? The rules for becoming a correspondent are simple: you can be any age, but the ideal age is somewhere between twelve and twenty-five; you must have access to a video camera; and you must have something important to say.

"Obviously," Kris emphasizes, "the better the shooter you are, the better chance you have of seeing your story on the air. We do all the editing and graphics and final post-production work, so just get the best stuff you can and remember, quality audio is extremely important." (copyright Videomaker Magazine)

Community Service Award
★ Special Olympics World Games 1995 – Kids TV – New Haven, Connecticut

References

External links
Official site

Young Artist Awards ceremonies
1995 film awards
1995 television awards
1996 in American cinema
1996 in American television
1996 in California